Rackley-Willie Allen Racing (shortened to Rackley-W.A.R.) is an American stock car racing team that competes in the NASCAR Craftsman Truck Series, Super Late Model, and Pro Late Model. They currently field the No. 25 Chevrolet Silverado full-time for Matt DiBenedetto in the NASCAR Craftsman Truck Series. They also since 2008 have fielded Super Late Model and Pro Late Model, currently in SLM they field the No. 26 full-time for TBA, then in PLM they field the No. 25 full-time for Carson Brown, and No. 26 full-time for Dawson Sutton.

The team was founded in 2008 by NASCAR Craftsman Truck Series driver Willie Allen as a Late Model team under the name Willie Allen Racing which was shortened to W.A.R. and as a Shock Builder under W.A.R. Shocks. In 2020, Rackley Roofing CEO, Curtis Sutton, bought out half ownership of the team to form the team into a NASCAR Camping World Truck Series team at the start of 2021.

Craftsman Truck Series

Truck No. 25 history

Multiple drivers (2021) 
On December 18, 2020, it was announced that former truck series driver, Willie Allen, and Rackley Roofing CEO, Curtis Sutton, would be forming their team, Rackley WAR, that will debut in the 2021 NASCAR Camping World Truck Series season, with Timothy Peters set as the full-time driver. The team made their first truck start at the 2021 NextEra Energy 250, finishing 26th, after suffering a mechanical issue. Peters' best finish for the team was 16th, at Las Vegas Motor Speedway. 

On June 1, 2021, it was announced that Rackley WAR and Timothy Peters would part ways after the 2021 North Carolina Education Lottery 200 at Charlotte. Josh Berry was announced as the new driver of the No. 25, scheduled to drive three races for the team, Texas, Nashville, and Pocono. Berry would give the team their best career finish, getting 10th at the SpeedyCash.com 220 at Texas. Berry would later go on to drive six more races for Rackley, starting at the Corn Belt 150 at Knoxville Raceway.

Brett Moffitt would return to the truck series to drive the No. 25 at the 2021 Victoria's Voice Foundation 200 at Las Vegas Motor Speedway. Moffitt would start 22nd and finish 25th.

After a 8-year hiatus, Willie Allen, co-founder of the team, made his NASCAR Camping World Truck Series return at Talladega Superspeedway, for the 2021 Chevrolet Silverado 250. Allen started 30th and finished 18th.

Matt DiBenedetto (2022–present) 

On January 6, 2022, it was announced that Matt DiBenedetto will drive the No. 25 truck full-time for the 2022 season. He started the season with a 10th place finish at Daytona. DiBenedetto scored six top-10 finishes during the regular season, but was unable to make the playoffs. On July 23, Rackley WAR announced that DiBenedetto would return to the No. 25 for the 2023 season. After a six race streak of finishing outside the top 10, DiBenedetto would give the team their first win in the Truck Series, after taking the checkered flag at the Talladega fall race.

Truck No. 25 results

Truck No. 26 history 
On June 20, 2022, Rackley W.A.R. announced that they will be fielding a second truck for the 2022 Rackley Roofing 200, the No. 26, which will be driven by Tate Fogleman. Fogelman will also drive the truck at the 2022 CRC Brakleen 150.

Truck No. 26 results

Truck No. 27 history 
On June 3, 2021, Rackley W.A.R. announced that Cup Series driver, William Byron, will make his truck series return at Nashville Superspeedway for the Rackley Roofing 200, under a second entry for the team. It was his first truck series start since 2016, where he finished fifth in the championship. Byron would end up getting 36th, due to an engine failure.

Truck No. 27 results

References

External links 

Stock car racing
American auto racing teams
NASCAR teams